Connecticut History may refer to:
History of Connecticut
Connecticut History (encyclopedia), an online encyclopedia